Mi Ranchito Estate is a census-designated place (CDP) in Starr County, Texas, United States. It is a new CDP for the 2010 census with a population of 281. Parts of this new CDP were formed from the former Los Villareales CDP.

Geography
Mi Ranchito Estate is located at  (26.387810, -98.873329).

Education
It is in the Rio Grande City Grulla Independent School District (formerly Rio Grande City Consolidated Independent School District).

References

Census-designated places in Starr County, Texas
Census-designated places in Texas